The Marine Parade Group Representation Constituency is a five-member Group Representation Constituency (GRC) located in the central, eastern and north-eastern areas of Singapore. The constituency consists of a section of Bedok, Chai Chee, Geylang, Kaki Bukit, Kallang, Kembangan, Marine Parade, Mountbatten, Ubi, Serangoon and Hougang. There are a total of 5 divisions in this GRC: Marine Parade, Geylang Serai, Braddell Heights, Joo Chiat and Kembangan-Chai Chee. The current MPs are from the People's Action Party (PAP) Tan Chuan Jin, Edwin Tong, Seah Kian Peng, Tan See Leng and Mohd Fahmi Aliman.

Members of Parliament

Electoral results

Elections in 2020s

Elections in 2010s

Elections in 2000s

Elections in 1990s

Elections in 1980s

References
2020 General Election's result
2011 General Election's result
2006 General Election's result
2001 General Election's result
1997 General Election's result
1992 By-Election's result
1991 General Election's result
1988 General Election's result

Singaporean electoral divisions
Bedok
Geylang
Hougang
Kallang
Marina East
Marine Parade
Serangoon
Toa Payoh